Lazar Marjanović (born 8 September 1989) is a Serbian professional footballer who plays for Mačva Šabac.

Honours
Diósgyőr
Hungarian League Cup (1): 2013–14

External links

1989 births
Living people
Sportspeople from Niš
Serbian footballers
Association football midfielders
FK Srem players
FK Leotar players
HŠK Zrinjski Mostar players
FK Radnički 1923 players
Diósgyőri VTK players
FC Dinamo Batumi players
FK Krupa players
FK Proleter Novi Sad players
RFK Grafičar Beograd players
FK Mačva Šabac players
Nemzeti Bajnokság I players
Serbian SuperLiga players
Serbian First League players
Premier League of Bosnia and Herzegovina players
Erovnuli Liga players
Serbian expatriate footballers
Expatriate footballers in Bosnia and Herzegovina
Expatriate footballers in Hungary
Expatriate footballers in Georgia (country)
Serbian expatriate sportspeople in Bosnia and Herzegovina
Serbian expatriate sportspeople in Hungary